Orange Marine (formerly France Télécom Marine) is a wholly owned subsidiary of Orange S.A. It is a major actor in the laying of new submarine communications cables and the maintenance of existing cables across the world's oceans.
The company is active in all areas of these activities, including the study (survey) and the shore ends. Orange Marine took control of Elettra (previously owned by Telecom Italia) on October 1, 2010, and now operates six cable ships - i.e. 15% of the world fleet. The CEO of Orange Marine and Elettra is Raynald Leconte, Chief Engineer of Mines.

Installation and maintenance activities

Orange Marine lays new submarine cables and repairs broken links without any interruption of traffic. Orange Marine and Elettra fleets perform an average of 40 operations a year.

Orange Marine has completed the laying and maintenance of cables in West Africa in Senegal, Cameroon, Benin, Angola, Nigeria and South Africa, as well as in East Africa, Reunion Island, Madagascar and Mauritius, Asia and Indonesia. The company also laid a new cable in the Caribbean sea, linking U.S. Virgin Islands, the Dominican Republic and Jamaica.

Cable ships fleet

The fleet covers all of the world's oceans, divided into four regions of operation: ACMA (Atlantic and Northern Europe), MECMA with Elettra (Mediterranean, Black Sea, Red Sea), Southern Hemisphere (West, South and East Africa) and the Indian Ocean. 
Submarine cables laid in the same area are covered by a maintenance agreement.

Orange Marine and Elettra own a fleet of six cable ships and a complete range of submarine engines, shipping from its marine bases or foreign harbours:

 Cable ship (C/S) Raymond Croze, based in la Seyne-sur-Mer at the MMB (Mediterranean Marine Base), performs the repairs on cables in the Mediterranean, the Black Sea, and the Red Sea.
 C/S Leon Thevenin, based in Brest at the AMB (Atlantic Marine Base), repairs the cables in the Atlantic zone and in Northern Europe.
 C/S Chamarel, based in Cape Town (South Africa), operates in the Southern Hemisphere.
 C/S René Descartes is dedicated to the installation of submarine cables on a worldwide range.
 C/S Certamen works with the Raymond Croze on cable maintenance in the Mediterranean, Black and Red Seas.
 C/S Teliri operates laying operations, mainly around the Mediterranean Basin.
 C/S Antonio Meucci conducts submarine systems inspections, ROV operations and maintenance of telecommunications cables.
 C/S Pierre de Fermat maintains submarine cables in the Atlantic and Northern Europe zone.

Elettra operates two cable ships, the Certamen and the Teliri, under the Italian flag, and owns a cable depot in Catania.

In order to protect, watch and repair intercontinental damaged links, Orange Marine, through its subsidiary SIMEC, designs, manufactures and operates submarine vehicles (ROV and ploughs) used to carry out assignments:
 The Hector ROV (Remotely Operated Vehicle), which is remotely controlled from the ship via its umbilical cable, can lift the cable, hold it and cut it using articulated arms.
 Elodie, the plough, is used to bury the cable at significant depths.

Key figures 

 about 150 repair operations between 2006 and 2010
 four operation zones: ACMA (Atlantic and Northern Europe), MECMA (Mediterranean, Black Sea, Red Sea), Southern Hemisphere (West, South and East Africa) and the Indian Ocean
 in the past 40 years cable ship Chamarel, alias Vercors, laid  of submarine cables

See also 
 Orange S.A.
 Submarine communications cable
 Cable layer

External links 
 
 Orange Marine presentation on Orange website
 Presentation of Orange Marine's maintenance activity
 International Cable Protection Committee ICPC
 Newsletter for the whole industry involved in the submarine cable market
 France Telecom-Orange-led LION2 submarine cable system is ready for service - FierceTelecom
 France Telecom buys Telecom Italia undersea cable subsidiary

Bibliography 
 Du Morse à l'Internet - 150 ans de télécommunication par câbles sous-marins by Rene Salvador, Gérard Fouchard and Yves Rolland, 2006, 

Orange S.A.
Telecommunications companies of France